Blastobasis centralasiae is a moth in the family Blastobasidae. It is found in Central Asia and the southern part of European Russia.

References

Moths described in 2007
Blastobasis